Harri Jenkins (born 28 March 1996) is a British Paralympic athlete who competes in sprint and middle-distance events in the T33 classification.

Personal history
Jenkins was born in Neath, and resides in Bryncoch.

Athletics career
Jenkins became involved in Para sport through Disability Sport Wales. Jenkins tried several sports through the Insport Series, before settling on wheelchair racing and wheelchair basketball. In his younger years competing in wheelchair basketball he moved to sprint racing and had great success.

He won gold in the men's T33 100m at the 2018 European Championships in Berlin, Germany, and bronze in the same event at the 2019 World Championships in Dubai, United Arab Emirates.

Jenkins won Bronze at the European championships 2021 in the ++T33++/T34 after having his wheelchair stolen in May.

Jenkins was a member of the Great Britain team to compete at the Tokyo Paralympics. He took part in the 100 metres (T33) sprint, finishing third in a time of 18.55 seconds.

References

External links
 
 

Living people
1996 births
English male wheelchair racers
British male sprinters
Paralympic bronze medalists for Great Britain
Paralympic athletes of Great Britain
Paralympic medalists in athletics (track and field)
Athletes (track and field) at the 2020 Summer Paralympics
Medalists at the 2020 Summer Paralympics